Michael Wagmüller (1839–1881) was a German sculptor who completed a number of commissions in London and exhibited at the Royal Academy.

Wagmuller was born in Regensberg, Germany, and studied at the industrial school in Munich, then at the Academy of Fine Arts there. After returning from London to Munich he worked as a Professor at the Academy.

References 

1839 births
1881 deaths
19th-century German sculptors
German male sculptors
Academic staff of the Academy of Fine Arts, Munich